Christopher Schmid is the baritone ex-vocalist of the German gothic doom band Lacrimas Profundere.
Christopher left the band April 4, 2007 due to prolonged stress from touring with the band. He has, however, been seen at shows with the band, singing for songs such as "Without", which originally appeared on "Burning, A Wish." He has also remained as the band's lyricist, and has done backing vocals, and has been renowned for his poetic, dark style, exercised in all albums, even with the dawn of their gothic rock/metal sound.

References

German male singers
German heavy metal singers
Living people
Year of birth missing (living people)